John Aloysius Maguire was an Irish politician. He was an independent member of Seanad Éireann from 1943 to 1944. He was elected to the 4th Seanad in 1943 by the Industrial and Commercial Panel. He lost his seat at the 1944 Seanad election.

References

Year of birth missing
Year of death missing
Members of the 4th Seanad
Independent members of Seanad Éireann